Mārtiņš Roze (28 September 1964 – 8 September 2012) was a Latvian politician. From 2002 till 2009 he was Minister for Agriculture of Latvia. He was member of Latvian Farmers' Union. He has graduated from University of Latvia.

References

1964 births
2012 deaths
Politicians from Riga
Latvian Farmers' Union politicians
Ministers of Agriculture of Latvia
Deputies of the 9th Saeima
University of Latvia alumni